The Glasgow Sharks is an Australian rules football club in Glasgow, Scotland.

History
The Sharks were re-formed in late 2003 by Australian Andrew Butler from what had been the Caledonia Sharks, who had existed in Glasgow for a time during the 1990s existed sporadically.

The recreation of the Sharks was down to hard work by Butler to acquire Sponsorship from local Aussie theme bar the Walkabout and recruitment drive on Australia Day providing details of training, contacts. Etc. also hanging Posters in and around Glasgow (Backpacker Hostels, Internet Café's, libraries, Sports Club/Gyms and Shops) inviting anyone to come along and join in. this generated enough interest for Scotland to have their very own Aussie Rules League with a Team back in Glasgow.

The club wore blue jumpers with a white shark logo on the front (based on the WAFL Club East Fremantle Shark's Guernsey).  The club was captained by Andrew Butler.

Honours

Haggis Cup 2011 
Haggis Cup 2014 

SARFL 2016 Mens Premiership

Tyne Tees Cup 2016 Winners 

Inaugural SARFLW 2019 Women's Premiership

References

External links
Glasgow Sharks
Scottish Aussie Rules Football League

Australian rules football clubs in Scotland
Sports teams in Glasgow
2003 establishments in Scotland
Australian rules football clubs established in 2003